Antony Hewish  (11 May 1924 – 13 September 2021) was a British radio astronomer who won the Nobel Prize for Physics in 1974 (together with fellow radio-astronomer Martin Ryle) for his role in the discovery of pulsars. He was also awarded the Eddington Medal of the Royal Astronomical Society in 1969.

Early life and education
Hewish attended King's College, Taunton. His undergraduate degree, at Gonville and Caius College, Cambridge, was interrupted by the Second World War. He was assigned to war service at the Royal Aircraft Establishment, and at the Telecommunications Research Establishment where he worked with Martin Ryle. Returning to the University of Cambridge in 1946, Hewish completed his undergraduate degree and became a postgraduate student in Ryle's research team at the Cavendish Laboratory. For his PhD thesis, awarded in 1952, Hewish made practical and theoretical advances in the observation and exploitation of the scintillations of astronomical radio sources, due to foreground plasma.

Career and research
Hewish proposed the construction of a large phased array radio telescope, which could be used to perform a survey at high time resolution, primarily for studying interplanetary scintillation. In 1965 he secured funding to construct his design, the Interplanetary Scintillation Array, at the Mullard Radio Astronomy Observatory (MRAO) outside Cambridge. It was completed in 1967. One of Hewish's PhD students, Jocelyn Bell (later known as Jocelyn Bell Burnell), helped to build the array and was assigned to analyse its output. Bell soon discovered a radio source which was ultimately recognised as the first pulsar. Hewish initially thought that the signal might be radio frequency interference, but Bell was able to show that remained at a constant right ascension, which is unlikely for a terrestrial source. The scientific paper announcing the discovery had five authors, Hewish's name being listed first, Bell's second.

Hewish and Ryle were awarded the Nobel Prize in Physics in 1974 for work on the development of radio aperture synthesis and for Hewish's decisive role in the discovery of pulsars. The exclusion of Bell from the Nobel prize was controversial (see Nobel prize controversies). Fellow Cambridge astronomer Fred Hoyle argued that Bell should have received a share of the prize,  although Bell herself stated "it would demean Nobel Prizes if they were awarded to research students, except in very exceptional cases, and I do not believe this is one of them". while Michael Rowan-Robinson later wrote that "Hewish was undoubtedly the major player in the work that led to the discovery, inventing the scintillation technique in 1952, leading the team that built the array and made the discovery, and providing the interpretation".

Hewish was professor of radio astronomy in the Cavendish Laboratory from 1971 to 1989 and head of the MRAO from 1982 to 1988. He developed an association with the Royal Institution in London when it was directed by Sir Lawrence Bragg. In 1965 he was invited to co-deliver the Royal Institution Christmas Lecture on "Exploration of the Universe". He subsequently gave several Friday Evening Discourses and was made a Professor of the Royal Institution in 1977. Hewish was a fellow of Churchill College, Cambridge. He was also a member of the Advisory Council for the Campaign for Science and Engineering.

Awards and honours
Hewish had honorary degrees from six universities, including Manchester, Exeter and Cambridge, was a foreign member of the Belgian Royal Academy, American Academy of Arts and Sciences and the Indian National Science Academy. The National Portrait Gallery holds multiple portraits of him in its permanent collection. Other awards and honours include:
 Elected a Fellow of the Royal Society (FRS) in 1968
 Eddington Medal, Royal Astronomical Society (1969)
 Dellinger Gold Medal, International Union of Radio Science (1972)
 Albert A. Michelson Medal, Franklin Institute (1973, jointly with Jocelyn Bell Burnell)
 Fernand Holweck Medal and Prize (1974)
 Nobel Prize for Physics (jointly) (1974)
 Hughes Medal, Royal Society (1976)
 Elected a Fellow of the Institute of Physics (FInstP) in 1998

Personal life
Hewish married Marjorie Elizabeth Catherine Richards in 1950. They had a son, a physicist, and a daughter, a language teacher. Hewish died on 13 September 2021, aged 97.

Religious views
Hewish argued that religion and science are complementary. In the foreword to Questions of Truth, Hewish writes, "The ghostly presence of virtual particles defies rational common sense and is non-intuitive for those unacquainted with physics. Religious belief in God, and Christian belief ... may seem strange to common-sense thinking. But when the most elementary physical things behave in this way, we should be prepared to accept that the deepest aspects of our existence go beyond our common-sense understanding."

See also
 List of astronomers

References

Further reading

External links

 Antony Hewish interviewed on Web of Stories
 Interviewed by Alan Macfarlane 26 March 2008 (video)
  including the Nobel Lecture, 12 December 1974 Pulsars and High Density Physics
 
The Papers of Professor Antony Hewish held at Churchill Archives Centre

1924 births
2021 deaths
Alumni of Gonville and Caius College, Cambridge
20th-century British astronomers
British Nobel laureates
Fellows of Churchill College, Cambridge
Fellows of Gonville and Caius College, Cambridge
Nobel laureates in Physics
People from Fowey
Place of death missing
Fellows of the Royal Society
Foreign Fellows of the Indian National Science Academy
English Christians
People educated at King's College, Taunton
People from Taunton
English Nobel laureates
Spectroscopists
Radio astronomers